Battle Stations is an album by saxophonists Eddie "Lockjaw" Davis and Johnny Griffin recorded in 1960 and released on Prestige Records.

Reception

AllMusic reviewer Alex Henderson stated: "Battle Stations is an album that fans of heated two-tenor exchanges shouldn't overlook."

Track listing 
 "What's Happening" (Fletcher Henderson) – 6:51     
 "Abundance" (Norman Simmons) – 6:54     
 "If I Had You" (Jimmy Campbell and Reg Connelly, Ted Shapiro) – 6:45     
 "63rd Street Theme" (Johnny Griffin) – 7:12     
 "Pull My Coat" (Richard Evans) – 6:40     
 "Hey Jim!" (Babs Gonzales, James Moody) – 8:00

Personnel 
Eddie "Lockjaw" Davis, Johnny Griffin – tenor saxophone
 Norman Simmons – piano
 Victor Sproles – bass
 Ben Riley – drums

References 

Eddie "Lockjaw" Davis albums
Johnny Griffin albums
1960 albums
Albums produced by Esmond Edwards
Albums recorded at Van Gelder Studio
Prestige Records albums